Podolsky District is an abolished administrative and municipal district (raion), one of the thirty-six in Moscow Oblast, Russia. It was located in the southwest of the oblast just south of the federal city of Moscow. It was administrative center the city of Podolsk (which is not administratively a part of the district).

History
A part of Podolsky District was merged into the federal city of Moscow on July 1, 2012. In 2015, the district has been abolished, its territory, with the city of Podolsk, was included in the City Under Oblast Jurisdiction with the administrative territory and Podolsk Urban Okrug.

Notable residents 

Matthew Chizhov (1838–1916), sculptor, born in the village of Pudov

References

Notes

Sources

Districts of Moscow Oblast